Physalaemus nattereri (common name: Cuyaba dwarf frog) is a frog native to central and southeastern Brazil and eastern Bolivia and Paraguay.

Description
It has two "false eyes" on its rear. The 3–4 cm frog lifts its rear end when threatened, startling predators. If a predator does not get fooled by the eyespots, and decides to move closer, the frog can produce an unpleasant secretion that comes from glands located in the eyespots. Similar display is known from Physalaemus deimaticus.

Reproduction 
A study in Bodoquena (in the Mato Grosso do Sul state of Brazil) found Physalaemus nattereri to be an explosive breeder, with most of the reproductive activity occurring within a few days after heavy rainfall. Males formed choruses to attract females but they could also actively search for females. Egg clutches were deposited in the margins of temporary ponds. Several pairs may use the same foam nest. Mean clutch size was about 3800 eggs. Females were larger (mean snout–vent length , range 43–56 mm; mean body mass 19.3 g) than males (range 43–55 mm; 11.4 g). Ovaries made about 22% of female body mass; fecundity increased with the female body size.

Habitat and conservation
Physalaemus nattereri is a fossorial and seasonal frog. It inhabits savannas and grasslands in the Cerrado biome and is found on the ground near standing and temporary waterbodies, such as ponds and swamps. It could be locally threatened by spread of intensive agriculture. It is present in several protected areas.

References

nattereri
Amphibians of Bolivia
Amphibians of Brazil
Amphibians of Paraguay
Amphibians described in 1863
Taxa named by Franz Steindachner